Grimaldo González (22 September 1922 – 14 February 2007) was a professional football player and manager who spend most of his career in the Mexican Primera División.

Playing career

Club
Born in Lima, González played as a forward. In 1946, he moved to Mexico to play for ADO de Orizaba. He joined Veracruz the following season, but would enjoy his greatest success with Tampico by winning the 1952–53 season championship. Tampico clinched the title in the penultimate round, winning 1–0 against Club América with González scoring the winning goal.

Managerial career
After he retired from playing, González became a football coach. He managed Tampico, Torreón, Tigres de la UANL and Ciudad Madero. He would lead Torreón, Tigres and Ciudad Madero to promotions to the Mexican Primera División.

Personal life
González died in Gómez Palacio at age 84.

References

1922 births
2007 deaths
Footballers from Lima
Association football forwards
Peruvian footballers
Peruvian expatriate footballers
Liga MX players
C.D. Veracruz footballers
Expatriate footballers in Mexico
Peruvian football managers
Tigres UANL managers
Peruvian expatriates in Mexico